Timothy Richard Burns (born April 14, 1968) is an American businessman from the Commonwealth of Pennsylvania. He ran as a Republican in the 2010 special election to represent Western Pennsylvania's 12th congressional district in the U.S. House of Representatives.  Burns won the party nomination but lost the November general election to Democratic incumbent Mark Critz. From mid-October 2011 until ending his campaign in early February 2012, Burns was a candidate for the Republican nomination for United States Senate to challenge incumbent Senator Bob Casey, Jr. in the 2012 election.

Early life, education and career
Burns was born in Morgantown, West Virginia; his family later moved to Johnstown, Pennsylvania where he grew up in the Hornerstown section of the city. He graduated from Greater Johnstown High School in 1986. In 1990, Burns obtained his Bachelor of Science degree in Computer Science from Indiana University of Pennsylvania in Indiana, Pennsylvania.

In 1992, Burns co-founded TechRx, a pharmaceutical technology company that was started in the basement of his house. The company created prescription-automation software for pharmacies that improved the process of filling prescriptions with greater accuracy.  The company eventually grew to over 400 employees before it was sold in 2003 to the Atlanta company NDCHealth Corporation.

Political campaigns

2010, United States House, special

In April 2009, Burns announced his intention to seek the Republican nomination to oppose then-incumbent Congressman John Murtha in November 2010. Following Murtha's February 2010 death, a special election was scheduled for May 18, 2010. Republicans from the 12th district met on March 11, 2010, in Latrobe, to choose their nominee. Tim Burns was nominated, receiving 85 of 131 votes cast. In a speech prior to the nomination vote, Burns referred to his support for the Tea Party movement, articulated his positions on the current plans for health care reform, United States energy independence and the national deficit, and described his nomination as "an opportunity to put a common sense conservative in a seat that has long been held by a political insider". He identifies as pro-life, staunchly opposes federal funding for elective abortion, and opposed the federal health care legislation.

Burns received endorsements from Sarah Palin, Dick Armey, and FreedomWorks, a Washington, D.C. conservative PAC run by Armey. On FoxNews's Hannity, Tucker Carlson said a Burns win in the district would be "a major upset for the Republicans". However, Democratic nominee Mark Critz won, 52.6% to 45.1%.

2010, United States House, general

Burns ran and lost again, although by a slimmer margin, to incumbent Mark Critz in the general election on November 2, 2010, with Rep. Critz garnering 51% of the vote over Burns' 49%.

2012, United States Senate

On October 12, 2011, Burns announced his intention to seek the Republican nomination to challenge Democratic incumbent Bob Casey, Jr. in the 2012 Pennsylvania United States Senate election. On February 2, 2012, Burns effectively ended his bid for Casey's Senate seat. In his announcement, Burns said he would remain politically active and participate in opposing the policies of the Obama administration and Bob Casey, saying, "It is a battle that I am committed to pursuing, but not one that I will be doing as a candidate for the United States Senate." The announcement came amid speculation that Burns would pursue a bid for the Congressional seat representing Pennsylvania's newly-drawn 12th congressional district. Burns opted not to run for U.S. House, however, and the 12th district Republican nomination went to Keith Rothfus.

Personal life
Burns and his family reside in Eighty Four, Pennsylvania. He has two sons, Brock and Trent, and attends St. Benedict the Abbot Catholic Church in McMurray.

References

External links
 Tim Burns for Senate official U.S. Senate campaign site (archived)
 Tim Burns for Congress official congressional campaign site (archived)

Campaign contributions at OpenSecrets.org

1968 births
Indiana University of Pennsylvania alumni
Living people
Pennsylvania Republicans
People from Cambria County, Pennsylvania
Politicians from Johnstown, Pennsylvania